Markus Seelaus (born February 16, 1987) is an Austrian footballer who currently plays for Austrian side SV Innsbruck.

External links

DAC Dunajska Streda Profile

1987 births
Living people
Austrian footballers
Austrian expatriate footballers
Association football midfielders
Expatriate footballers in Slovakia
Slovak Super Liga players
FC DAC 1904 Dunajská Streda players
FC Wacker Innsbruck (2002) players
Austrian expatriate sportspeople in Slovakia
Austria youth international footballers